The Laughing Mask  is a 2014 American independent horror film written and directed by Michael Aguiar and is his feature film directorial debut. It released on October 31, 2014, and stars John Hardy as a man who must face down the serial killer known only as "Laughing Mask", who murdered John's family.

Plot 

Jake Johnson is a man with a mission. His wife Jaycee was murdered by the brutal serial killer named the Laughing Mask years ago and he's determined to bring the man to justice. He's not the only one who wants to end the Laughing Mask's reign of terror, as the police have set Kate on the case. However, as the film progresses more and more people fall victim to the Laughing Mask, some of whom have been murdered in ways that resemble crimes that the victims purportedly committed.

Cast 
John Hardy as Jake Johnson
Jeffrey Gwyn Jenkins as The Laughing Mask
Sheyenne Rivers as Kate 
Inge Uys as Jaycee Johnson
Gabriel Lee as Detective Cordova
Floyd Adams as Pig Man
Arisia Aguiar as Barbara Johnson
Jade Aguiar as Nancy Johnson
Bill Asbury as Rancor Member
Laura Bush as  Planner
Liz M. Day as Chief Maria Mendoza
Manny Dortanieves as Groundskeeper
Anthony Giovanni Elias as Wink
Flavia Falquetti as Barista
Matt Ganey as Lloyd Grant
Brent 'Clutch' Gaubatz as Cole Masters
Wayne Earle Kinney as Cash
Trina Christine Mason as Mermaid Woman

Release

Home media
The Laughing Mask was released on DVD by Leomark Studios on July 16, 2016.

Reception 
Critical reception has been mostly positive, with many outlets praising Aguiar for the usage of vintage music and animation clips while also criticizing it for feeling disjointed. Starburst and HorrorNews.net both panned The Laughing Mask, as Starburst felt that it was "a film that doesn’t really do anything right. You may laugh but it won’t have been because of anything intentional." HorrorNews.net commented that they enjoyed the film's music, villain, and the foundational story, but that "the way the film tells the story is uneven, including seemingly unnecessary scenes while at the same time, leaving out key plot information."

Dread Central gave the film a rating of 3.5/5 stars, writing "With a fantastic-looking presentation and even better instances of gratuitous violence, the movie treads back to the fun days of cut-em-up flicks, and Aguiar looks as if he paid some serious attention to detail with the crafting on this one." Bloody Disgusting gave The Laughing Mask three out of five skulls, saying "in spite of the minor technical missteps and the editing shortcomings, The Laughing Mask definitely deserves attention for the inventive melding of classic slashers and cop drama, as well as some brutal and inventive kills."

References

External links
 
 
 

2014 films
2014 horror films
2014 independent films
2010s serial killer films
2010s slasher films
American independent films
American serial killer films
American slasher films
Films shot in Florida
2014 directorial debut films
2010s English-language films
2010s American films